"Hamein Aazma" (Urdu: ہمیں آزما, literal English translation: "come try us") is a rock-influenced song single by the Pakistani rock band Entity Paradigm from their debut album, Irtiqa. The single was released in 2003, and is the first single from the band's debut album. The song is written by band member, Ahmed Ali Butt.

The song is similar to "Kahan Hai Tu" as far as the beginning is concerned but then the track unfold its own unique blend of heavy guitar notes and drums. The single was also the soundtrack of the comedy sitcom "Jutt & Bond" in which band members Fawad Khan and Ahmed Ali Butt were featured.

Music video
The video starts off with footage from the sitcom "Jutt & Bond" in which Fawad A. Khan and Ahmed Ali Butt themselves acted and later showing the band performing the song at a stage.

The music video was directed by Zain Ahmed.

Track listing
Hamein Aazma

External links
 Guitar Tabs for Entity Paradigm
 Official Website

2003 singles
Pakistani songs
Pakistani rock songs
2003 songs